Lydomorphus is a genus of beetle in family Meloidae, containing the following selected species:

 Lydomorphus chanzyi (Fairmaire, 1876)
 Lydomorphus dusaulti (Dufour, 1821)
 Lydomorphus palaestinus (Kirsch, 1870)
 Lydomorphus saharanus (Kaszab, 1961)
 Lydomorphus verrucicollis (Karsh, 1881)

References

 Biolib

 
Meloidae
Polyphaga genera
Taxa named by Léon Fairmaire